Blood Compact is a 1972 Filipino action film starring former Philippine President Joseph Estrada.

References

External links
 

Philippine action films
Tagalog-language films
1972 films
1972 action films
Joseph Estrada